Minnesota State Highway 226 (MN 226) is a short  highway in north-central Minnesota, which runs from its intersection with State Highway 34 in Henrietta Township (east of Park Rapids) and continues north to its northern terminus at Dorset. The route becomes Hubbard County Road 7 at Dorset.

Route description
Highway 226 serves as a short north–south connector route between State Highway 34 and the community of Dorset in north-central Minnesota.

The southern terminus of Highway 226 intersects State Highway 34, which is briefly four lanes to facilitate turns and two through lanes.  The northern terminus of Highway 226 is approximately one-tenth of a mile north of the Heartland Trail intersection in Dorset, where the route becomes Hubbard County State-Aid Highway 7. 

The route is legally defined as Route 226 in the Minnesota Statutes.

History
Highway 226 was authorized on July 1, 1949.

The route was paved at the time it was marked.

Major intersections

References

External links

Highway 226 at the Unofficial Minnesota Highways Page

226
Transportation in Hubbard County, Minnesota